Agryz (Ägerce) is a town and the administrative center of Agryzsky District in the Republic of Tatarstan, Russia, located on the Izh River (Volga's basin),  east of Kazan. As of the 2010 Census, its population was 19,300.

History
It was founded as a settlement serving the construction of the Kazan–Yekaterinburg railway. It was granted town status on August 28, 1938.

Agryz was one of the residence centers of the Udmurt Jews, who spoke the Udmurt idiom of Yiddish (Udmurtish).

Administrative and municipal status
Within the framework of administrative divisions, Agryz serves as the administrative center of Agryzsky District, to which it is directly subordinated. As a municipal division, the town of Agryz is incorporated within Agryzsky Municipal District as Agryz Urban Settlement.

Notable people
Asaf Abdrakhmanov (1918–2000), naval figure, Hero of the Soviet Union

References

Notes

Sources

External links
Official website of Agryz 
Directory of organizations in Agryz 

Cities and towns in Tatarstan
Sarapulsky Uyezd